The Sikorsky MH-60T Jayhawk is a multi-mission, twin-engine, medium-range helicopter operated by the United States Coast Guard for search and rescue, law enforcement, military readiness and marine environmental protection missions. It was originally designated HH-60J before being upgraded and redesignated beginning in 2007. 

Chosen to replace the HH-3F Pelican, the MH-60T is a member of the Sikorsky S-70 family of helicopters and is based on the United States Navy's SH-60 Seahawk helicopter. Development began in September 1986, first flight was achieved on 8 August 1989, and the first HH-60J entered USCG service in June 1990. Production ended in 1996 after 42 helicopters were produced; three retired SH-60F Seahawks were also remanufactured to MH-60T specifications beginning in 2010.  A total of 42 MH-60Ts are in service with the Coast Guard.

Development
Chosen to replace the HH-3F Pelican, the HH-60J was based on the United States Navy's SH-60 Seahawk and a member of the Sikorsky S-70 helicopter family. Compared to its predecessor, the HH-3F, the HH-60J is lighter, faster, and equipped with more sophisticated electronics and more powerful engines. The HH-60J was developed in conjunction with the U.S. Navy's HH-60H Rescue Hawk.

Sikorsky began development in September 1986 and aircraft registration number 6001 achieved first flight on 8 August 1989. The first aircraft was delivered to the USCG for developmental testing in March, 1990 at NAS Patuxent River, Maryland. In March 1991, ATC Mobile, Alabama became the first USCG unit to fly the HH-60J, allowing instructor pilots to prepare for pilot training. Coast Guard Air Station Elizabeth City, North Carolina was the first USCG operational unit to fly the HH-60J. Sikorsky produced 42 HH-60Js with sequential registration numbers from 6001 through 6042. Sikorsky ended production in 1996 after completing the 42 units on contract. Subsequently, the Coast Guard has converted three ex-Navy SH-60F Seahawks into MH-60T Jayhawks (registration numbers 6043-6045) as attrition replacements.

MH-60T upgrade program
The USCG began converting its 42 HH-60Js to MH-60Ts in January 2007. This avionics and capabilities upgrade is part of the USCG's Integrated Deepwater System Program and will provide a glass cockpit, an enhanced electro-optic/infrared sensor system as well as a radar sensor system and airborne use of force capability.  The airborne use of force package includes both weapons for firing warning and disabling shots and armor to protect the aircrew from small arms fire.  The MH-60T upgrades were completed in February 2014.

Design

The Jayhawk has a radar for search/weather that gives its nose a distinctive look. A forward looking infrared (FLIR) sensor turret can be mounted below its nose.  It can carry three  fuel tanks with two on the port side rack and one on the starboard side rack.  The starboard side also carries a  capacity rescue hoist mounted above the door.  The hoist has  of cable. 
It uses the NAVSTAR Global Positioning System as its primary long range navigational aid, using a Collins RCVR-3A radio to simultaneously receive information from four of the NAVSTAR system's 18 worldwide satellites.  The helicopter is normally based on land but can be based on 270 foot medium endurance Coast Guard Cutters (WMEC) or 418 foot Legend-Class National Security Cutters (WMSL) .

The MH-60T is equipped with a 7.62 mm M240H medium machine gun and a .50 in Barrett M82 semi-automatic rifle for firing warning and disabling shots. These weapons also serve as defensive armament.

Operational history

In 1990, HH-60J Jayhawks began replacing HH-3F Pelican and CH-3E Sea King helicopters in service with the US Coast Guard. HH-60Js perform search and rescue missions, along with other missions such as maritime patrol and drug interdiction.  Coast Guard cutters with their HH-60Js and other helicopters performed security and interdiction in the Persian Gulf in 1991 in support of Operation Desert Storm and also in 2003 for Operation Enduring Freedom.

In January 2011, Juneau Mountain Rescue volunteers, working with the Alaska State Troopers and the Coast Guard, rescued an injured hiker on Ripikski Mountain, near Haines. A Coast Guard MH-60 Jayhawk helicopter, dispatched from Sitka, transported the hiker to Bartlett Regional Hospital in Juneau, Alaska.

On 29 October 2012, Jayhawk number 6031 (70-1790) was used during the offshore rescue of the crew of HMS Bounty during Hurricane Sandy.

Starting in 2009, Coast Guard Jayhawks have been tasked with a secondary mission of drug patrol/enforcement. These missions are usually conducted in cooperation with Coast Guard cutters.

In 2016, some Jayhawks were delivered in a yellow color scheme celebrating 100 years of Coast Guard aviation. The yellow color scheme represented colors used on certain Coast Guard and Navy helicopters in the 1940s and 1950s. The first of the operational aircraft in this color scheme was delivered to Air Station Astoria in Oregon on January 15, 2016. The Jayhawk along with the Eurocopter MH-65 Dolphin are the two helicopter types in the Coast Guard inventory.

Variants
HH-60J Medium range recovery helicopter. 42 units delivered to the USCG between 1990 and 1996.
MH-60T Medium range recovery helicopter. 39 surviving HH-60J airframes received upgraded avionics and operational capabilities, including armaments, from 2007 to 2014. Three SH-60Fs were converted to MH-60T specifications as attrition replacements.

Operators

 United States Coast Guard
 CGAS Astoria
 CGAS Cape Cod
 CGAS Clearwater
 CGAS Elizabeth City
 CGAS Kodiak, Alaska
 CGAS San Diego
 CGAS Sitka
 CGAS Traverse City
 CGAS Borinquen
 Coast Guard Aviation Training Center

Accidents
As of July 2010, three Jayhawks have been involved in crashes, including two fatal crashes.

Specifications (HH-60J)

 Most data is for HH-60J with data for MH-60T noted below.

See also

References

External links

 MH-60T on US Coast Guard site
 HH-60J JAYHAWK Helicopter Product Information . Sikorsky Aircraft Corporation
 HH-60 Jayhawk and MH-60T on globalsecurity.org
 U.S. Coast Guard Fielding Armed HH-65Cs, -60Js. Rotor & Wing
 Coast Guard Plans Jayhawk Modernization. VTOL.org

United States military helicopters
Search and rescue helicopters
H-060, H
1980s United States helicopters
Twin-turbine helicopters
H-060 Jayhawk
Aircraft first flown in 1989